Mulla Ali Kani ((1888–1805) was an Iranian Shia Muslim scholar and philosopher involved with the Iranian Constitutional Revolution. He was a pupil of Muhammad Hasan al-Najafi. Kani was in charge of religious affairs of Iran, and had a great influence on people and even on Naser al-Din Shah Qajar and his court.
After the singing  of the Reuter concession in 1873 which in practice made Iran a colony of Britain, Mulla Ali Kani wrote a letter to the King, Nasir al-Din Shah, and opposed  this contract. He wrote that what Reuter gains through this contract is even more than what Britain gained in India. He also wrote that when there is a flaw in governmental affairs, it is religious scholars' duty to refer to it, regardless of whether the king favors this approach, or tries to correct it or not. He asked the king in strong terms to cancel the contract and dismiss the prime minister, who was behind the signing of the contract. As a result of these objections, as well as foreign objections to the contract, Nasir al-Din Shah eventually canceled the contract and removed the minister from the office.
Kani died in Tehran in 1888 and was buried in the shrine of Shah-Abdol-Azim shrine in Rey.

See also 
Iranian Constitutional Revolution

References

External links

1888 deaths
19th-century Iranian politicians
People from Amol
19th-century Iranian philosophers
Iranian grand ayatollahs
People of the Persian Constitutional Revolution
1805 births